Wolfpac (stylized as WOLFPAC) is an American rap rock group formed in 1997 by former Bloodhound Gang member and co-founder Daddy Long Legs. The group's musical style fuses hip hop beats and metal samples. Its lyrical style draws from horrorcore, focusing on subjects such as resurrection, revenge, necrophilia, and standing up for one's own beliefs. The group's live performances from time to time include a DJ, guitar player and strippers.

Wolfpac released its debut LP,  Wicked This Way Comes, on May 18, 1999, through Chord Recordings. Daddy Long Legs claims that he funded the LP's production by robbing graves and selling the bones to occult stores. Wolfpac expanded its cult following through appearances on The Howard Stern Show and Opie and Anthony, and released the album, Evil Is... on January 16, 2001, on Megaforce Records. They have toured the US several times as well as Japan and the UK.

In 2006, the group released the underground hip hop compilation When There's No More Room in Hell: Volume I, featuring contributions from Big B and The Dirtball, Danny Diablo, Grave Plott, Jason Porter and Intrinzik, Q-Strange, Vanilla Ice, and many others. The group released its first pornographic DVD, The Girls of WOLFPAC Volume 1, in 2007 and its second, The Girls of WOLFPAC Volume 2, in 2008. Both were nominated for an AVN Award (2008 for Best Pro-Am Release and in 2009 for Most Outrageous Sex Scene!). Wolfpac has performed at the Gathering of the Juggalos annually since 2004 and hosts the Super Deluxe Fun Time Variety Hour on Psychopathic TV (formerly known as W-Fuck-Off Radio). In 2010 they made a cameo in American Western comedy film Big Money Rustlas In 2017, the band appeared on Comic Book Men (Season 6, Episode 11) where they tried to sell a lamp prop from A Christmas Story to help fund their upcoming tour.

Discography 
 Somethin' Wicked This Way Comes (1999)
 Evil Is... (2001)
 Square Peg Round Hole (2013)

References

External links 
 Official website

Horrorcore groups
Musical groups established in 1997
Musical groups from Pennsylvania
Musical groups from Philadelphia